Christopher Denard Dunlap (born November 16, 1985) is a former American and Canadian football wide receiver. He was signed by the New England Patriots as an undrafted free agent in 2007. He played college football at Georgia Tech.

Dunlap has also been a member of the Montreal Alouettes.

Professional career

New England Patriots
Dunlap was signed by the New England Patriots as an undrafted free agent in 2007, but was released prior to the regular season. He was re-signed on July 21, 2008 but waived on August 14.

Montreal Alouettes
On September 26, 2008, Dunlap was signed to the practice squad of the Montreal Alouettes. He was re-signed for the 2009 season on December 12, 2008. However, he was released on March 17, 2009.

External links
Georgia Tech Yellow Jackets bio
Montreal Alouettes bio
New England Patriots bio

1985 births
Living people
American football wide receivers
American players of Canadian football
Canadian football wide receivers
Georgia Tech Yellow Jackets football players
Montreal Alouettes players
New England Patriots players
People from Miramar, Florida
Players of American football from Florida
Sportspeople from Broward County, Florida
Players of Canadian football from Florida